Old Salt is the seventh studio album by American heavy metal band Valient Thorr. It was released in July 2016 under Napalm Records, making it their first album not to be released under Volcom Entertainment since their 2003 debut Stranded on Earth.

Track list

References

2016 albums
Valient Thorr albums
Napalm Records albums